St Margaret's Church, Carsington, is a Grade II* listed parish church in the Church of England in Carsington, Derbyshire.

History

The church may date from the 13th century. A sundial set into the east wall is inscribed Re-edified 1648. The west end gallery has an inscription This loft was erected at the onely charge of Sir Philp Gell, Baronett. Anno Domini 1704 by consent of the parish at a meeting in Carsington: for the use of his tenants in Hopton.

Parish status
The church is in a joint parish with
All Saints' Church, Alderwasley
St James the Apostle's Church, Bonsall
All Saints' Church, Bradbourne
All Saints' Church, Ballidon
St James' Church, Brassington
All Saints' Church, Elton
St James' Church, Idridgehay
Holy Trinity Church, Kirk Ireton
Holy Trinity Church, Middleton-by-Wirksworth
St Mary's Church, Wirksworth

Organ
The organ was installed in 1932 and was built by Robert Oldacre. A specification of the organ can be found on the National Pipe Organ Register.

See also
Grade II* listed buildings in Derbyshire Dales
Listed buildings in Carsington

References

Church of England church buildings in Derbyshire
Grade II* listed churches in Derbyshire